In the Lutheran Church, Matins is a morning-time liturgical order combining features that were found in the Medieval orders of Matins, Lauds, and Prime. Lutherans generally retained the Order of Matins for use in schools and in larger city parishes throughout the 16th and 17th centuries. In some places, Matins continued to be sung in Latin still longer. For example, at the close of the eighteenth century in Leipzig, one historian records that "every Sunday and festival day the canonical hours taken over from the Roman Catholic Church are still being chanted before [the chief service] at 6:30 am." The orders experienced a revival in the Confessional Renewal that took place in the 19th century, and now have a stable place in modern Lutheran liturgical books.

Representative examples
A few examples of Matins in the Lutheran Church can be found below. The first column contains the Offices of Matins, Lauds, and Prime as found in the pre-Reformation breviary from the Archdiocese of Magdeburg. The second column provides the Office of Matins from the Lutheran Cathedral of Havelberg, a suffragan of Magdeburg, as found in the 1589 Vesperale of Matthäus Ludecus, dean of the Havelberg Cathedral. The third column provides Matins as it was sung in the Lutheran Cathedral of Magdeburg in 1613, precisely one century after the pre-Reformation breviary in the first column. The final column contains the Order of Matins as found in the 1941 Lutheran Hymnal of the Lutheran Church–Missouri Synod. Along with the outline of the office itself, the various propers for Matins of the First Sunday in Advent are also included.

References

Bibliography 

Lutheran liturgy and worship